Parari, Paraíba is a municipality in the state of Paraíba in the Northeast Region of Brazil. Its area is 207.814 km2 and the population is 1,758 (2020 est.), being the least populous city in the state.

See also
List of municipalities in Paraíba

References

Municipalities in Paraíba